El show del fútbol is an Argentine television program.

Awards
 2015 Martín Fierro Awards
 Best sports program

Nominations
 2013 Martín Fierro Awards
 Best sports program

References

Sports television in Argentina
América TV original programming